"You Don't Know What It's Like" is a song by the Canadian rock band Econoline Crush from their third studio album, Brand New History. The song was first released in 1999 as the final track on MuchMusic's Big Shiny Tunes 4 compilation album. The song was released as a CD single in 2000 and was very successful in Canada. The song gained some moderate exposure in the U.S. after being used in promotional clips for the third season of the UPN sci-fi series Roswell.

Charts

References

External links

2000 singles
1999 songs
Song recordings produced by Bob Rock
Restless Records singles